ACSE may refer to:
 Association Control Service Element, OSI method
 5-methyltetrahydrofolate:corrinoid/iron-sulfur protein Co-methyltransferase, an enzyme
 Automatic Control and Systems Engineering Department at the University of Sheffield, UK
 Annual Christmas Shopping Extravaganza Watertown, MA